Brandon Holiday (born January 25, 1972) is a Paracanoe Sprint Kayaker from the United States.

While growing up in Maplewood, New Jersey Holiday played various sports, tennis, baseball and training in martial arts.   He also grew up with Systemic Lupus, Primary Addison's and a blood clotting condition (Antiphospholipid syndrome).  After attending the University of Maryland Eastern Shore and Salisbury University, he became a police officer but an injury in the line of duty and medical complications from Systemic Lupus forced him to leave the Salisbury City police force.

In 2006, after four months in the hospital battling with blood clots, wound care and hyperbaric chamber treatments, doctors had to amputate his left leg below the knee. 10 months later attended the Extremity Games. Extremity Games is an extreme sports event for people with amputations and/or spinal cord injuries, hosted by Athletes with Disabilities Network. It was this competition athletes disabilities surf, rock climb, wakeboard and ride motocross.  Since 2007, Brandon has won a bronze medal in mixed martial arts, silver medal in recreational kayaking and paddled his kayak into five gold medals at the United States Sprint Canoe Kayak National Championships, becoming the 2014 and 2015 K1, Paracanoe men's 200m & 500m United States Paracanoe Sprint Kayak Champion and the 2014 Master's 35+ Able Bodied 500m Champion, beating out able-bodied contenders in his age group. Over the past 9 years Brandon has been working with other disabled community members, veterans through adaptive sports and mentoring & outreach through Athletes with Disabilities Network Northeast Chapter.

In 2016 Brandon made the US National Paracanoe Team and traveled to Duisburg, Germany to compete at the 2016 ICF Paracanoe World Championships.  World Championships in 2016 were the Paralympic qualifying competition for Paracanoe Athletes.  He was unable to advance and qualify for the US, but his teammate Alana Nichols, Kelly Allen and Ann Yoshida qualified and competed at the 2016 Rio, Paralympics.

On November 5, 2016, Holiday competed in the first ever amputee tennis tournament held at the Cherry Hill Racquet club.  Brandon has also competed in 2008 at the Extremity Games in Michigan, winning a bronze medal in the Pancrase tournament.  He is currently the executive director of Athletes with Disabilities Network Northeast, which is a non-profit that to promote a better quality of life for people with physical disabilities, especially for veterans and first responders by mentoring and creating awareness and offering opportunities for local athletic, recreational and educational activities. He created the Northeast Chapter to create a mentoring outreach program and adaptive sports program, which assists disabled community members heal with the help of paired mentors and use sport as a catalyst to healing.

References

External links
 http://sunshinepando.com/2016/05/brandon-holiday-athlete-community-force-for-the-disabled-inspiration/
 http://www.teamusa.org/USA-Canoe-Kayak/Features/2016/May/02/Sprint-and-Paracanoe-National-Teams
 https://netplaymag.com/2016/11/16/once-an-athlete-always-an-athlete/
 http://www.healio.com/orthotics-prosthetics/industry-news/news/print/o-and-p-news/%7B703e7477-4bad-423b-9cc4-87cdc3a1d2d4%7D/athletes-with-disabilities-network-hosts-sports-ability-day
 http://www.teamusa.org/USA-Canoe-Kayak/Meet-the-National-Team/Paracanoe-National-Team
 http://www.phillyvoice.com/adaptive-athletes-say-there-life-after-amputation/
 http://6abc.com/sports/maple-shade-man-training-to-compete-in-2016-paralympics/516694/
 http://philadelphia.cbslocal.com/2017/02/15/man-who-suffered-10-heart-attacks-inspires-other-through-athletics/#.WKR1Iv3UNFs.facebook

Paracanoeists of the United States
Kayakers
People from Maplewood, New Jersey
1972 births
Living people